Anatolius is both a given name and a surname. Notable people with the name include:

Given name
 Anatolius of Laodicea (died 283), Bishop of Laodicea in Syria, also known as Anatolius of Alexandria
 Anatolius, Vicarius of the Diocese of Asia in 352
 Anatolius (praetorian prefect), Praetorian prefect of Illyricum in 360, probably identical to Vindonius Anatolius
 Anatolius (magister militum) (421–451), East Roman general, politician and diplomat
 Patriarch Anatolius of Constantinople, Patriarch of Constantinople (449 - 458)
Anatolius (curator), Byzantine honorary consul, killed in an earthquake in 557
Anatolius (Osroene), Byzantine governor of Osroene, executed as a crypto-pagan c. 579
 Frans Anatolius Sjöström (1840–1885), Finnish architect

Surname
 Vindonius Anatolius, 4th century Greek writer

See also 
 Anatoly (name)
 Anatol
 Anatoli (disambiguation)